Monroe Abbey,  (May 30, 1904 – November 28, 1993) was a Canadian lawyer specializing in mining law, and a Jewish civic leader in Montreal.

He was president of Canadian Jewish Congress from 1968 to 1971.

He was married to Minnie Cummings. His daughter, Sheila Finestone, was a Member of Parliament and Senator.

In 1978, he was made a Member of the Order of Canada in recognition for being a "devoted community worker who has held office in every important Jewish organization in Montreal".

References

1904 births
1993 deaths
Activists from Montreal
Canadian Jews
Canadian Jewish Congress
Members of the Order of Canada
Lawyers from Montreal
Jews from Quebec
McGill University alumni
Bishop's University alumni
Université de Montréal alumni